Aleksandr Nikolaevich Kurlovich (English Alternate: Alexander Kurlovich, 28 July 1961 – 6 April 2018) was a Soviet weightlifter. He trained at Armed Forces sports society in Grodno.

In 2006 he was elected member of the International Weightlifting Federation Hall of Fame.
He was caught in 1984 entering Canada with $10,000 worth of anabolic steroids that he wanted to sell to fellow weightlifters.

Career
Kurlovich had twelve world records to his name.

As of 2019, only four men (Antonio Krastev of Bulgaria, Behdad Salimi of Iran,
Gor Minasyan of Armenia, 
and Georgian world-record holder Lasha Talakhadze) have ever snatched more than his 215 kg, only six men (Soviet teammates Sergey Didyk, Anatoly Pisarenko and Leonid Taranenko, Andrei Chemerkin of Russia, Talakhadze of Georgia, and Hossein Rezazadeh of Iran) have ever lifted a clean and jerk of more than his 260 kg, and only Talakhadze, Rezazadeh, and Taranenko have totalled more than the 472.5 kg that Kurlovich lifted to win the 1987 World Championship. (Taranenko won 1987 World Championship)

Honors
Merited Master of Sport of the USSR  (1987)
 Order of the Badge of Honour
 Honored Worker of Physical Culture of the Republic of Belarus (1992)

Weightlifting achievements 
 Olympic champion (1988 and 1992);
 Senior world champion (1987, 1989, 1991 and 1994);
 Set twelve world records during his career.

Career bests 
 Snatch: 215.0 kg in Athens 1989 World Weightlifting Championships.
 Clean and jerk: 260.0 kg in Ostrava 1987 World Weightlifting Championships.
 Total: 472.5 kg (212.5 + 260.0) 1987 in Ostrava in the class more than 110 kg.

Death
Kurlovich died on 6 April 2018 in Grodno, Belarus. He was 56.

Major results

References

External links 
 World records and titles by Aleksandr Kurlovich
 Aleksandr Kurlovich at Database Weightlifting

1961 births
2018 deaths
Doping cases in weightlifting
Sportspeople from Grodno
Soviet male weightlifters
Belarusian male weightlifters
Olympic weightlifters of the Soviet Union
Olympic weightlifters of the Unified Team
Olympic weightlifters of Belarus
Olympic gold medalists for the Soviet Union
Olympic gold medalists for the Unified Team
Weightlifters at the 1988 Summer Olympics
Weightlifters at the 1992 Summer Olympics
Weightlifters at the 1996 Summer Olympics
Olympic medalists in weightlifting
Medalists at the 1992 Summer Olympics
Medalists at the 1988 Summer Olympics
European Weightlifting Championships medalists
World Weightlifting Championships medalists